Anarsia incerta is a moth in the family Gelechiidae. It was described by Ueda in 1997. It is found in Japan (Ryukyus).

The length of the forewings is 4.7–5.7 mm for males and 4.7–6.6 mm for females. The forewings are whitish, irregularly tinged with fuscous, scattered with blackish scales. The hindwings are brownish grey, hyaline on the basal half and with the veins darker.

References

incerta
Moths described in 1997
Moths of Japan